Public Service Announcement is the third studio album by Purling Hiss, released on October 12, 2010, by Woodsist.

Track listing

Personnel
Adapted from the Public Service Announcement liner notes.
 Mike Polizze – vocals, instruments
 Aaron Haze Biscoe – photography

Release history

References

External links 
 Public Service Announcement at Discogs (list of releases)
 Public Service Announcement at Bandcamp

2010 albums
Purling Hiss albums
Woodsist albums